Magnus Wolff Eikrem (born 8 August 1990) is a Norwegian professional footballer who plays for Molde FK in Eliteserien. His regular playing position is in attacking midfield, though he can play anywhere across the midfield.

Career

Early years
Born in Molde, Eikrem began his football career as a 12-year-old with his local club, Molde FK. He was picked up after he attended one of Ole Gunnar Solskjær's soccer schools in Norway, despite the schools being for youngsters aged 14–16. Nevertheless, he impressed the coaches so much that they allowed him to attend, and he was signed by Manchester United on his 16th birthday.

Manchester United
Eikrem was a regular starter for the United under-18 side in the 2006–07 season, and helped the team to the final of the FA Youth Cup, where they lost to Liverpool 4–3 on penalties after the two-legged match finished 2–2 on aggregate. Eikrem was one of two United players to miss a penalty in the shoot-out, the other being captain Sam Hewson. Eikrem also captained the Manchester United youth team to the final of the 2007 Milk Cup but United lost in stoppage time to Brazilian side Fluminense. A few days later, he played in his first game for the Manchester United first team, coming on as a substitute for Ryan Giggs in a 4–0 pre-season friendly win away to Dunfermline Athletic.

Eikrem continued as a regular member of the under-18 side throughout the 2007–08 season, making the odd appearance on the reserve team bench, before becoming a full member of the reserve side in 2008–09. During the season, he helped United to second place in the 2008–09 Premier Reserve League, as well as a cup double over Bolton Wanderers in the Manchester and Lancashire Senior Cups.

After playing in the reserve team's first four games of the 2009–10 season and scoring in a 2–1 league win over Wigan Athletic, Eikrem was rewarded by being given the number 42 shirt for the first team's League Cup third round match against Wolverhampton Wanderers. For the 2010–11 football season, Eikrem was named as a member of United's Champions League squad. He was named as a member of a "B-squad" alongside several other younger players such as Will Keane, Joe Dudgeon, Oliver Gill, Ben Amos and Corry Evans.

Molde
In January 2011, Eikrem transferred back to Norwegian team Molde, who were managed by former Manchester United reserve team manager Ole Gunnar Solskjær. In his first season, Eikrem was involved in the Molde squad that won Tippeligaen for the first time. He helped successfully defend the title in the 2012 Tippeligaen season.

Heerenveen
On 24 June 2013, Eikrem signed a four-year contract for Heerenveen. He made his debut in the Eredivisie in a 4–2 home win against AZ. He scored his first goal for Heerenveen on 23 August 2013, against defending champions Ajax.

Cardiff City
On 8 January 2014, Welsh side Cardiff City announced that Eikrem had signed a contract with the club, for an undisclosed fee and duration. He made his debut three days later, coming on as a 66th-minute substitute for Gary Medel in a 2–0 home defeat against West Ham United. He went on to make six top-flight appearances as Cardiff were relegated back to the second tier.

After a poor start to the 2014–15 season, Solskjaer was sacked and his replacement, Russell Slade, placed Eikrem on the transfer list. On 19 December 2014, Eikrem had his contract terminated by mutual consent after not playing under Slade.

Malmö FF
On 26 January 2015, Eikrem signed a three-year contract with Swedish champions Malmö FF. On 22 February 2015, Eikrem scored one goal and made two assists in his first competitive match for the club, a cup fixture against Assyriska FF that Malmö won 3–0.

Seattle Sounders FC
Eikrem joined Seattle Sounders FC on 30 January 2018. He was waived on 20 July 2018.

Return to Molde
On 25 July 2018, Eikrem returned to Molde after five years away, signing a four-and-a-half-year contract. The day after, on 26 July, he made his first appearance since returning to the club as a 65th minute substitute in a 3–0 home victory over Laçi in the Europa League. He played an important role in Molde's title-winning season in 2019, and was nominated to the Eliteserien Player of the Year award. Eikrem finished the 2019 season with 13 goals in 33 appearances in all competitions.

Ahead of the 2020 season, on 17 January, Eikrem was announced as Molde's new captain.

International career
Eikrem received his first international call-up to the under-21s alongside Manchester United teammate Joshua King in November 2010. Eikrem made his debut for the senior team when he replaced Markus Henriksen as a substitute in the 75th minute in a 1-1 friendly draw against Denmark on 15 January 2012.

Personal life
Eikrem is the son of former Molde player, Knut Hallvard Eikrem, who made over 220 appearances for the club in his time there. Eikrem has been diagnosed with diabetes mellitus.

Career statistics

Club

International
Appearances and goals by national team and year
As of 4 July 2015

Honours
Molde
 Eliteserien: 2011, 2012, 2019, 2022
 Norwegian Cup: 2013, 2021–22

Malmö FF
 Allsvenskan: 2016, 2017

References

External links

 Malmö FF profile 
 
 

1990 births
Living people
People from Molde
Norwegian footballers
Association football forwards
Molde FK players
Manchester United F.C. players
SC Heerenveen players
Cardiff City F.C. players
Malmö FF players
Seattle Sounders FC players
Eliteserien players
Eredivisie players
Premier League players
English Football League players
Allsvenskan players
Major League Soccer players
Norway international footballers
Norway youth international footballers
Norway under-21 international footballers
Norwegian expatriate footballers
Expatriate footballers in England
Expatriate footballers in the Netherlands
Expatriate footballers in Sweden
Expatriate footballers in Wales
Norwegian expatriate sportspeople in England
Norwegian expatriate sportspeople in the Netherlands
Norwegian expatriate sportspeople in Sweden
Norwegian expatriate sportspeople in Wales
Sportspeople from Møre og Romsdal